Pierre Cardo (born 28 August 1949 in Toulon, Var) is a member of the National Assembly of France.  He represents the Yvelines department,  and is a member of the Union for a Popular Movement. As of 2010, he is president of Autorité de Régulation des Activités Ferroviaires.

References

1949 births
Living people
Politicians from Toulon
Mayors of places in Île-de-France
Republican Party (France) politicians
Union for French Democracy politicians
Democratic Convention (France) politicians
Liberal Democracy (France) politicians
Union for a Popular Movement politicians
Deputies of the 12th National Assembly of the French Fifth Republic
Deputies of the 13th National Assembly of the French Fifth Republic